The 1933 Belgian Grand Prix (formally the IV Grand Prix de Belgique) was a Grand Prix motor race held at Spa-Francorchamps on 9 July 1933. The 40-lap race was won by Tazio Nuvolari, of Scuderia Ferrari, driving a Maserati. Second and third were taken by the works Bugatti drivers Achille Varzi and René Dreyfus.

Background
The works Bugatti team, who had been absent from the previous Grande Épreuve, the French Grand Prix, returned to action, bringing their new 2.8 L Bugatti T59 to the Belgian Grand Prix. The car, which was originally intended to make its debut at Montlhéry, was driven by the team's most experienced driver, Achille Varzi. However, Varzi experienced issues with the T59 during practice, and therefore decided to revert to the older 2.3 L T51 model, which his teammates were still using.

Tazio Nuvolari, part of Scuderia Ferrari, the works Alfa Romeo team, was unhappy at how his team had been preparing his car, and so decided to try out the  Maserati 8CM s/n 3005 as well as his usual Alfa Romeo Monza during practice. The Maserati had been driven a week earlier at the Marne Grand Prix by Giuseppe Campari, whose injuries incurred at that race rendered him unfit to race at Spa. It was therefore available to be raced and was lent to Nuvolari, who was still under contract for the Scuderia, as part of a deal reached between Enzo Ferrari and Ernesto Maserati. Nuvolari ultimately decided to use the 8CM, once certain modifications had been made. Despite technically being entered by Scuderia Ferrari, Nuvolari's Maserati did not feature the team's prancing horse logo.

Report
 Despite starting from the back row of the grid, Nuvolari had taken the lead of the race by the end of the first lap, with his nearest rivals being his teammate Borzacchini, polesitter Chiron in a privateer Alfa Romeo, and the works Bugattis of Varzi and Dreyfus. By the 100 km mark, Nuvolari had opened up a 17-second lead over Borzacchini and Chiron, with Varzi, in fourth position, a further 45 seconds back. Lehoux was 8 seconds behind Varzi, and around 25 seconds ahead of Zehender and Dreyfus. Zehender, the only works Maserati competing in the Grand Prix, was the first casualty of the race, retiring due to transmission problems after ten laps. The Swiss driver "Marko" (Edgard Markiewicz), who had been at the back of the field throughout, was the second to retire when he crashed his car.

By the 200 km mark, Nuvolari's lead had increased to 36 seconds over Borzacchini, while Chiron was a further 14 seconds back. Nuvolari's lead over Varzi and Lehoux was in excess of two minutes, and the remainder of the field were more than three minutes behind the race leader. When Nuvolari took to the pits for fuel and tyres, Chiron, who had already overtaken Borzacchini, took the lead of the race, while Borzacchini and Varzi were promoted to second and third, respectively, with Nuvolari down to fourth place. Chiron's lead at the 300 km mark was over two minutes to Borzacchini, while Nuvolari, up to third, was a further minute back, having himself opened up a minute-and-a-half lead to Varzi in fourth. Chiron's lead was relatively short-lived, however, as he was forced to retire when his differential broke. The Frenchman Moll retired on the same lap as Chiron, after suffering problems with either his gearbox or his clutch. Two laps later, Nuvolari was back in the lead when a connecting rod broke in the engine of the erstwhile race-leader, Nuvolari's teammate, Borzacchini's Alfa Romeo Monza.

 Nuvolari's lead at the 400 km mark was up to 1:45 over Varzi, with Varzi's teammate Dreyfus a further minute and a half behind. Lehoux was fourth, comfortably ahead of fifth-placed Siena, Nuvolari's only remaining teammate left in the race. After 500 km, Nuvolari had extended his lead over Varzi to 2:14. As Varzi had a considerable time advantage over Dreyfus, he was able to make a tyre change towards the end of the race, and rejoin proceedings still in second place, albeit only just. Nuvolari took the victory with a gap of nearly four minutes to Varzi, while Dreyfus finished three seconds behind his teammate in third place. Lehoux, who had lost third gear, took fourth, ahead of Siena, the first Alfa to finish, in fifth place. Grover-Williams in the final Bugatti, who had experienced considerable problems with spark plugs, was a lap down in sixth, while Sommer was the last to finish in seventh, five laps behind the leaders, having had fuel feed issues throughout the race.

Entries

Starting grid
Grid positions were drawn by ballot and the cars' numbers were allocated in grid order (#2 for pole position, #4 for second place, etc.)

Classification

Race

References

External links

Belgian Grand Prix
Belgian Grand Prix
Grand Prix